Eowyn may refer to:

 Éowyn, a character from The Lord of the Rings
 Éowyn (musician) (born 1979), American Christian alternative rock artist
 Eowyn Ivey (born 1973), American author

Other uses
 Edwyn